These are the official results of the Women's Discus Throw event at the 1995 IAAF World Championships in Gothenburg, Sweden. There were a total number of 33 participating athletes, with two qualifying groups and the final held on Saturday, August 12, 1995.

Medalists

Schedule
All times are Central European Time (UTC+1)

Abbreviations
All results shown are in metres

Qualifying round

Group A

Group B

Final

See also
 1994 Women's European Championships Discus Throw (Helsinki)
 1996 Women's Olympic Discus Throw (Atlanta)

References
 Results
 IAAF

D
Discus throw at the World Athletics Championships
1995 in women's athletics